Georg Branting (21 September 1887 – 6 July 1965) was a Swedish Social Democrat and Olympic fencer. He was the son of Hjalmar Branting and a member of the Riksdag 1932–1961.

In the Spanish Civil War, a Scandinavian battalion of the International Brigades was named after him, as a sign of thanks for his vehement support of the Spanish Republic. Related to the Civil War of Finland in 1918, he wrote a book translated in 1925 in Finnish as: Oikeudenkäyttö Suomessa, Muutamia asiakirjoja selityksineen. He competed for Sweden in fencing at the 1908 and 1912 Summer Olympics.

References

External links
 

1887 births
1965 deaths
Fencers at the 1908 Summer Olympics
Fencers at the 1912 Summer Olympics
Members of the Första kammaren
Olympic fencers of Sweden
Politicians from Stockholm
Members of the Riksdag from the Social Democrats
Swedish people of the Spanish Civil War
20th-century Swedish lawyers
Swedish male épée fencers